Jotham or Yotam ("Yahweh is perfect" or "Yahweh is complete";) was the youngest of Gideon's seventy sons. He escaped when the rest were put to death by the order of his half-brother Abimelech (Judges 9:5).

When "the citizens of Shechem and the whole house of Millo" were gathered together "by the plain of the pillar" (i.e., the stone set up by Joshua, 24:26; compare Genesis 35:4) "that was in Shechem, to make Abimelech king", from one of the heights of Mount Gerizim he protested against their doing so in the earliest parable, that of the bramble-king. This parable is often repeated at Tu BiShvat and is famous in Israel. His words then spoken were prophetic. There came a recoil in the feelings of the people toward Abimelech, and then a terrible revenge, in which many were slain and the city of Shechem was destroyed by Abimelech (Judges 9:45). Having delivered his warning, Jotham fled to Beer from the vengeance of Abimelech (Judges 9:7–21).

References

Book of Judges people